Kuha All! is a Philippine documentary and news magazine television program broadcast by All TV, hosted by Anthony Taberna. It debuted on November 26, 2022.

Segments 
 Kuha Rin! - highlights snippets of the latest and trending videos.
 Kaya All! - a featured case study is assisted through any means of support needed to resolve the issue being discussed.
 Kuha Mo? - Taberna's no-holds-barred commentary on the subject at hand.

Production
Kuha All! is very similar to Anthony Taberna's former program, Kuha Mo!, which was previously cancelled in 2020 by ABS-CBN (the previous operator of now-All TV Channel 2) along with all the current affairs programs as a result of the network's shutdown and permanent loss of broadcast franchise followed by the company's retrenchment layoffs.

Taberna signed contract with All TV on September 6, 2022. He admitted that he accepted the offer to host this program due to network's significant talent fee.

References

All TV (Philippines) original programming
2020s Philippine television series
2022 Philippine television series debuts
Filipino-language television shows
Television shows filmed in the Philippines